Join With Us may refer to:
 "Join with Us" (song), a song by the Feeling
 Join with Us (album), an album by the Feeling